The Macedonian vimba  or Malamída (Vimba melanops) is a European freshwater fish species in the family Cyprinidae.
 
It is found in the Aegean Sea basin in Greece (Thessaly, Macedonia and Thrace), and adjacent Bulgaria, North Macedonia, and northwestern Turkey (Evros drainage). It inhabits rivers and freshwater reservoirs.

It is threatened by habitat loss. The taxonomic distinctness from the more widespread Vimba vimba is not clear.

Sources

Vimba
Cyprinid fish of Europe
Fish described in 1837
Taxonomy articles created by Polbot